Magne Flem (3 February 1908 – 30 November 1995) was a Norwegian journalist and newspaper editor. He was born in Ålesund, and was a brother of Dagfinn Flem. He edited the newspaper Sunnmørsposten from 1946 to 1983, the first period together with his brother. During the German occupation of Norway he was a member of the clandestine intelligence organization XU.

References

1908 births
1995 deaths
People from Ålesund
Norwegian newspaper editors
XU
20th-century Norwegian writers